Solomon ben David was a Karaite leader of the late tenth and early eleventh centuries CE. He was the son of David ben Boaz. As a direct lineal descendant of Anan ben David, he was regarded as nasi and resh galuta of the Karaite community. He was succeeded by his son Hezekiah ben Solomon.

Karaite exilarchs
Karaite rabbis
10th-century Abbasid rabbis
11th-century Abbasid rabbis
Jewish royalty